"The Miser's Hoard" is the fourth episode of the ninth and final series of the British comedy series Dad's Army. It was originally transmitted on 23 October 1977.

Synopsis
Frazer gleefully counts up his profits for the week as he plans to use most of it to invest in more gold sovereigns, many of which he keeps in a box. Doctor Maceavedy unexpectedly drops in to inform Frazer that one of his patients will soon need Frazer's services (i.e. he has died) and accidentally knocks over the box, revealing Frazer's secret stash.

Doctor Maceavedy informs Mainwaring of Frazer's hoard at the bank the next day, worried that any theft or loss of the gold would have devastating effects on Frazer's health. Mainwaring agrees that Frazer should not keep the sovereigns in his house and resolves to convince the stingy Scotsman to sell them and buy an annuity at the bank (furiously denouncing Wilson's suggestion that Mainwaring is motivated by the fact that he, as bank manager, would profit from this). Deciding to raise the matter subtly, Mainwaring gives the whole platoon a lecture about how they should keep their money and valuables in the bank, again insisting that any profit for him is not part of the issue. Unfortunately, Frazer sees through Mainwaring's hints and rushes off, vowing he will never let anyone, least of all Mainwaring, get his gold.

Word of Frazer's hidden wealth soon spreads and is discussed at length in Hodges' grocer shop by Hodges, the Vicar (who wants to persuade Frazer to donate towards restoring the church) and the Verger. Frazer then misses parade, prompting the platoon to go looking for him (as this involves going to several pubs, Wilson ends up severely drunk) – after they come back unsuccessful, Frazer defiantly phones Mainwaring, saying he will hide the sovereigns where nobody will ever find them. Inspired by Pike remembering a film about a miser who buried his gold, Mainwaring assigns some of the platoon to stake out Frazer's house, certain he will do it that night. Much later, Frazer is spotted leaving his house by both the platoon and Hodges (who's out on air raid patrol). Followed secretly by the platoon, Frazer buries the box in the local graveyard. After he leaves, Mainwaring and the others dig up the box and attempt to break it open, only to be caught by the Vicar, the Verger and Hodges (who also followed Frazer), who insists their actions are illegal. Mainwaring agrees to settle the matter the next day.

At the Home Guard parade the next day, Mainwaring convinces Frazer to give him the key to the box, lecturing him that the ease with which they found the box proves that Frazer is better off entrusting his sovereigns to the bank (although Mainwaring also reluctantly agrees to let the Vicar take a small donation). When Mainwaring unlocks the box though, it turns out to contain a brick, revealing that Frazer hid his hoard elsewhere. Frazer mockingly suggests that the Vicar accept the brick as a donation and runs from the room, vowing to the last that Mainwaring will never get his gold.

Cast
Arthur Lowe as Captain Mainwaring
John Le Mesurier as Sergeant Wilson
Clive Dunn as Lance Corporal Jones
John Laurie as Private Frazer
Arnold Ridley as Private Godfrey
Ian Lavender as Private Pike
Janet Davies as Mrs Pike
Fulton Mackay as Doctor McCeavedy
Bill Pertwee as ARP Warden Hodges
Frank Williams as The Vicar
Edward Sinclair as The Verger
Colin Bean as Private Sponge

References

Dad's Army (series 9) episodes
1977 British television episodes